Mohammad Azarhazin (Persian: محمد آذر حزین, born January 8, 1951) is a retired Iranian amateur boxer who won a gold medal at the 1977 Asian Championships. He competed at the 1976 Olympics and was eliminated in the second bout.

References

1951 births
Living people
Boxers at the 1976 Summer Olympics
Olympic boxers of Iran
Iranian male boxers
Light-middleweight boxers
20th-century Iranian people